The 1973 Marshall Thundering Herd football team was an American football team that represented Marshall University as an independent during the 1973 NCAA Division I football season. In its third season under head coach Jack Lengyel, the team compiled a 4–7 record and was outscored by a total of 288 to 212. The team played its home games at Fairfield Stadium in Huntington, West Virginia.

Schedule

References

Marshall
Marshall Thundering Herd football seasons
Marshall Thundering Herd football